Darja Škrlj (born 13 March 1985 in Ljubljana) is a Slovenian figure skater who competes in ladies singles.  She won the gold medal at the Slovenian Figure Skating Championships in 2005.

External links
The Official Darja Škrlj Home Page

Darja Škrlj at the Slovene Skating Union

1985 births
Slovenian female single skaters
Living people
Sportspeople from Ljubljana
Competitors at the 2005 Winter Universiade